The ITTF AFRICA Cup is an annual table tennis competition held by the International Table Tennis Federation (ITTF) and the African Table Tennis Federation. The first edition was held in 2016.  The competition features men's and women's singles events, with 16 players qualifying to take part in each event, subject to a maximum of two players per association.

Starting from 2016, the Africa Cup serves as a qualification event for the World Cup.

Medalists

See also
African Table Tennis Championships
African Table Tennis Federation
PanAm Cup
Asian Table Tennis Championships

References

External links
African Table Tennis Federation (ATTF) 
2018 African Championships

 

Table tennis Championships
Table tennis in Africa
Recurring sporting events established in 1962